The Himalayan subtropical pine forests are a large subtropical coniferous forest ecoregion covering portions of Bhutan, India, Nepal, and Pakistan.

Geography
This huge pine forest stretches for 3000 km across the lower elevations of the great Himalaya range for almost its entire length including parts of Pakistan's Punjab Province in the west through Azad Kashmir, the northern Indian states of Jammu and Kashmir, Himachal Pradesh, Uttarakhand and Sikkim, Nepal and Bhutan, which is the eastern extent of the pine forest. Like so many Himalayan ecosystems the pine forests are split by the deep Kali Gandaki Gorge in Nepal, to the west of which the forest is slightly drier while it is wetter and thicker to the east where the monsoon rains coming off the Bay of Bengal bring more moisture.

Flora
The predominant flora of the ecoregion is a thin woodland of drought-resistant Pinus roxburghii trees with a ground cover of thick grass, as regular fires do not allow a shrubby undergrowth to establish itself. The ground cover consists of Arundinella setosa, cogon grass (Imperata cylindrica) and Themeda anathera.

Pine forest mainly grows on south-facing slopes although in western Nepal there are areas facing in other directions. Some of the larger areas can be found in the lower elevations of Kangra and Una Districts of Himachal Pradesh and in Bhutan. It occurs in smaller patches in eastern Himachal Pradesh and lower Uttarakhand, in the more thinly populated western Nepal, and on the lower elevations (between 1,000 and 2,000m) of the Sivalik and Himachal ranges.

Fauna
Although there is not a rich variety of wildlife here when compared to tropical rainforest for example the region is important habitat, especially for birds. Wildlife includes tigers and leopards although in smaller numbers than in the lowland areas where herds of grazing antelopes provide food for them, whereas these slopes do not sustain grazing in large numbers. More typical animals of the pine forest are langurs and other animals of the Himalayas. Birds include the chestnut-breasted partridge and cheer pheasants that hide in the lush grass.

Conservation
These habitats are vulnerable to logging for firewood or conversion to grazing or farmland and more than half the area has been cleared or degraded which then allows the mountain water to wash away the soil quickly. The most profound changes can be seen in central and eastern Nepal, where the forest has been cleared for terrace farming. The protected areas of pine forest are small but include part of the larger Jim Corbett National Park.

See also
List of ecoregions in India

References

External links

 
Himalayan forests
Ecoregions of the Himalayas
Ecoregions of Bhutan
Ecoregions of India
Ecoregions of Nepal
Ecoregions of Pakistan
.
.
Forests of India
Indomalayan ecoregions
Tropical and subtropical coniferous forests
Forests of Nepal